Queen mother is defined as "a queen dowager who is the mother of the reigning sovereign". The term has been used in English since at least 1560.

Definition

A queen mother is a person satisfying the following criteria:

 She is the mother of the current monarch.
 She is a queen dowager, i.e. the widow of a king.

Queen mother does not mean mother of the Queen; it applies whether the current monarch is queen or king.

As a queen, a queen mother retains the style of Her Majesty.

List of Queen Mothers 

The following is a list of women who can be classified as Queen Mother at some point in their lives.

English Queen Mothers (title not used in earlier periods)
 978–1000 Ælfthryth, (the first king's wife known to have been crowned and anointed as Queen of the Kingdom of England), widow of Edgar, mother of Æthelred the Unready.
 1042–1052 Emma of Normandy, mother of Edward the Confessor by her first husband Æthelred the Unready and Harthacnut by her second husband Cnut the Great.
 1189–1204 Eleanor of Aquitaine, widow of Henry II, mother of Richard I and King John.
 1216–1246 Isabella of Angoulême, widow of King John, mother of Henry III.
 1272–1291 Eleanor of Provence, widow of Henry III, mother of Edward I.
 1327–1358 Isabella of France, widow of Edward II, mother of Edward III.
 1422–1437 Catherine of Valois, widow of Henry V, mother of Henry VI.
 April–June 1483 Elizabeth Woodville, widow of Edward IV, queen mother during the 86 day reign of her son Edward V, until he was deposed by Richard, Duke of Gloucester and later killed as one of the Princes in the Tower.

Scottish Queen Mothers (title not used in earlier periods)
 1214–1233 Ermengarde de Beaumont, widow of William the Lion, mother of Alexander II.
 1249–1285 Marie de Coucy, widow of Alexander II, mother of Alexander III.
 1437–1445 Joan Beaufort, widow of James I, mother of James II.
 1460–1463 Mary of Guelders, widow of James II, mother of James III.
 1513–1541 Margaret Tudor, widow of James IV, mother of James V.
 1542–1560 Mary of Guise, widow of James V, mother of Mary, Queen of Scots.

British Queen Mothers
 1660–1669 Henrietta Maria of France, widow of Charles I, mother of Charles II. Although Charles I was executed in 1649, she became queen mother only in 1660 upon the restoration of her son Charles II.
 1910–1925 Alexandra of Denmark (though she preferred not to use the title), widow of Edward VII, mother of George V.
 1936–1952 Mary of Teck (who also preferred not to use the title), widow of George V, mother of Edward VIII and George VI, the latter of whom she outlived, the third of her sons to predecease her. 
 1952–2002 Elizabeth Bowes-Lyon, widow of George VI, mother of Elizabeth II; her fifty years is the longest that anyone has held the status of queen mother.

References

Sources
 Dictionary of National Biography
 Oxford Dictionary of National Biography
 Chambers Biographical Dictionary
 Encyclopædia Britannica

British queens consort
British royalty
British women
Maternity in the United Kingdom
Queen mothers
British